Clerodendrum schmidtii is an Asian species of flowering plant in the family Lamiaceae.  C. schmidtii is found throughout Indo-China; in Vietnam it may be called ngọc nữ Schmidt.

References

External links
 

schmidtii
Flora of Indo-China